Floyd Leroy Hudlow (November 9, 1943 – March 22, 2021) was an American football defensive back who played two seasons with the Atlanta Falcons of the National Football League. He was drafted by the Buffalo Bills in the tenth round of the 1965 AFL Draft. He was also drafted by the Philadelphia Eagles in the ninth round of the 1965 NFL Draft. Hudlow played college football at the University of Arizona and attended West Phoenix High School in Phoenix, Arizona.

He died on March 22, 2021, in Ocean Springs, Mississippi, at the age of 77.

References

External links
Just Sports Stats
College stats

1943 births
2021 deaths
Players of American football from Phoenix, Arizona
American football defensive backs
Arizona Wildcats football players
Buffalo Bills players
Atlanta Falcons players
American Football League players